There have been eight baronetcies created for persons with the surname Jackson, one in the Baronetage of England, one in the Baronetage of Great Britain and six in the Baronetage of the United Kingdom. As of 2014 four of the creations are extant.

The Jackson Baronetcy, of Hickleton in the County of York, was created in the Baronetage of England on 31 December 1660 for John Jackson.

The Jackson, later Duckett Baronetcy, of Hartham House in the County of Wiltshire, was created in the Baronetage of Great Britain on 21 June 1791. For more information on this creation, see Duckett baronets.

The Jackson Baronetcy, of Fort Hill in the County of Armagh, was created in the Baronetage of the United Kingdom on 21 April 1813 for George Jackson. The title became extinct on his death in 1851.

The Jackson Baronetcy, of Arlsey in the County of Bedford, was created in the Baronetage of the United Kingdom on 22 May 1851 for John Jackson. He was a Director of the Honourable East India Company and also represented Dover in the House of Commons. As of 31 January 2014 the present Baronet has not successfully proven his succession and is therefore not on the Official Roll of the Baronetage, with the baronetcy considered dormant since 1980.

The Jackson Baronetcy, of The Manor House in Birkenhead, was created in the Baronetage of the United Kingdom on 4 November 1869 for William Jackson, Liberal Member of Parliament for Newcastle under Lyne and Derbyshire North. The second Baronet briefly represented Coventry in Parliament. The third Baronet served as Lord-Lieutenant of Monmouthshire. In 1886, he assumed by Royal licence the additional surname of Mather. This surname was also used by the fourth, fifth, sixth and seventh Baronets.

The Jackson Baronetcy, of Stansted House in Stansted in the County of Essex, was created in the Baronetage of the United Kingdom on 24 July 1902 for Sir Thomas Jackson. He was Chairman of the Hong Kong and Shanghai Bank. The second Baronet was a Brigadier-General in the Army and fought in the Second Boer War and the First World War.

The Jackson Baronetcy, of Eagle House in Wimbledon in the County of Surrey, was created in the Baronetage of the United Kingdom on 10 February 1913 for the architect Thomas Graham Jackson. The third Baronet is a well-known composer and organist.

The Jackson Baronetcy, of Wandsworth in the County of Surrey, was created in the Baronetage of the United Kingdom on 4 July 1935 for Henry Jackson, Conservative Member of Parliament for Wandsworth Central. The title became extinct on his death in 1937.

Jackson baronets, of Hickleton (1660)
Sir John Jackson, 1st Baronet ( – )
Sir John Jackson, 2nd Baronet (1653–1680)
Sir Bradwardine Jackson, 3rd Baronet ( – )

Jackson, later Duckett baronets, of Hartham House (1791)
see Duckett baronets

Jackson baronets, of Fort Hill (1813)
Sir George Jackson, 1st Baronet (1776–1851)

Jackson Baronets, of Arlsey (1815)
Sir John Jackson, 1st Baronet (1763–1820)
Sir Keith Alexander Jackson, 2nd Baronet (1798–1843)
Sir Mountstuart Goodricke Jackson, 3rd Baronet (1836–1857)
Sir Keith George Jackson, 4th Baronet (1842–1916)
Sir Robert Montresor Jackson, 5th Baronet (1876–1940)
Sir John Montresor Jackson, 6th Baronet (1914–1980)
Sir Robert Jackson, 7th Baronet (1910–2000)
Sir Keith Arnold Jackson, 8th Baronet (1921–2000)
Sir Neil Keith Jackson, 9th Baronet (born 1952)

The heir apparent is the present holder's son Stephen Keith Jackson (b. 1973).

Jackson baronets, of The Manor House (1869)
Sir William Jackson, 1st Baronet (1805–1876)
Sir Henry Mather Jackson, 2nd Baronet (1831–1881)
Sir Henry Mather Mather-Jackson, 3rd Baronet (1855–1942)
Sir Edward Arthur Mather-Jackson, 4th Baronet (1899–1956)
Sir George Christopher Mather Mather-Jackson, 5th Baronet (1896–1976)
Sir Anthony Henry Mather Mather-Jackson, 6th Baronet (1899–1983) 
Sir William Mather-Jackson, 7th Baronet (1902–1985)
Sir (William) Thomas Jackson, 8th Baronet (1927–2004)
Sir (William) Roland Cedric Jackson, 9th Baronet (born 1954)

The heir apparent is the present holder's son Adam William Roland Jackson (born 1982).

Jackson baronets, of Stansted House (1902)
Sir Thomas Jackson, 1st Baronet (1841–1915)
Sir Thomas Dare Jackson, 2nd Baronet (1876–1954)
Sir George Julius Jackson, 3rd Baronet (1883–1956)
Sir (Walter David) Russell Jackson, 4th Baronet (1890–1956)
Sir Michael Roland Jackson, 5th Baronet (1919–2016)
Sir Thomas St Felix Jackson, 6th Baronet (born 1946)

There is no heir.

Jackson baronets, of Eagle House (1913)
Sir Thomas Graham Jackson, 1st Baronet (1835–1924)
Sir Hugh Nicholas Jackson, 2nd Baronet (1881–1979)
Sir Nicholas Fane St George Jackson, 3rd Baronet (born 1934)

The heir apparent is the present holder's only son Thomas Graham St George Jackson (born 1980).

Jackson baronets, of Wandsworth (1935)
Sir Henry Jackson, 1st Baronet (1875–1937)

References
Kidd, Charles, Williamson, David (editors). Debrett's Peerage and Baronetage (1990 edition). New York: St Martin's Press, 1990.

Baronetcies in the Baronetage of the United Kingdom
Extinct baronetcies in the Baronetage of England
Extinct baronetcies in the Baronetage of the United Kingdom